Edward Evans (1716 – 21 June 1798) was a Welsh poet.

Evans was a "bard according to the rites and ceremonies of the bards of Britain", and his pedigree is traced in one unbroken line to the ancient Druids. He was pastor at the Old Meeting House, Aberdare, from 1772 to 1798, and is said to have 'devoted his time faithfully to his religious duties, to the satisfaction of a large number of people, who attended from the country from a distance of many miles.'

He published a Welsh translation of S. Bourne's Catechism (1757), Book of Ecclesiastes done into Verse, by E. E. and Lewis Hopkin (Bristol, 1767), An Address delivered before the Association of Ministers at Dref Wen, near Newcastle Emlyn, with two Hymns (1775); and his poetical works were collected and edited by his son, Rees Evans (1778–1869), in Merthyr in 1804. Evans died on 21 June 1798, the day on which he had arranged to meet the other bards of the Chair of Glamorgan.

References

1716 births
1798 deaths
18th-century Welsh poets
18th-century Welsh people